Ognica may refer to the following places:
Ognica, Gmina Chojna in West Pomeranian Voivodeship (north-west Poland)
Ognica, Gmina Widuchowa in West Pomeranian Voivodeship (north-west Poland)
Ognica, Stargard County in West Pomeranian Voivodeship (north-west Poland)